Meoneurites is an extinct genus of  flies (Diptera). There is a single described species.

Species
†M. enigmatica Hennig, 1965

References

Carnidae
†
Prehistoric Diptera genera
Taxa named by Willi Hennig